Witts Springs is an unincorporated community and census-designated place (CDP) in Searcy County, Arkansas, United States. It was first listed as a CDP in the 2020 census with a population of 33.

Witts Springs has a post office with ZIP code 72686.

Education
The community is served by the Searcy County School District, which operates Marshall High School. On July 1, 2003, the Witts Springs School District consolidated into the Marshall School District. On July 1, 2004, the Marshall district and the Leslie School District consolidated to form the Searcy County district. In 2003 the high school portion of the Witts Springs School was moved to Marshall, and in 2004 the Witts Springs School closed altogether due to a low student enrollment.

Demographics

2020 census

Note: the US Census treats Hispanic/Latino as an ethnic category. This table excludes Latinos from the racial categories and assigns them to a separate category. Hispanics/Latinos can be of any race.

References

Census-designated places in Searcy County, Arkansas
Census-designated places in Arkansas
Unincorporated communities in Searcy County, Arkansas
Unincorporated communities in Arkansas